Caniglia is a surname. Notable people with the surname include:

Jeremy Caniglia (born 1970), American figurative painter and illustrator, primarily in fantasy and horror genres
Yano R Caniglia (1924-2013) Restaurateur https://en.wikipedia.org/wiki/Mister_C's
Maria Caniglia (1905–1979), Italian dramatic soprano